Shorewood High School is a comprehensive public high school located in the village of Shorewood, Wisconsin. It is part of the Shorewood School District.

As of the 2021–22 school year, the school had an enrollment of 635 students and 48.20 classroom teachers on a full-time equivalent basis, giving a student to teacher ratio of 13.17. The school's original colors were blue and gold but were changed to red and grey in 1930. Among options for extra curricular activities for students are 23 sports and more than 40 co-curricular clubs and activities.

Facilities

Administration Building
The original building on the campus is the administration building. Constructed in 1925, it features a 40-foot diameter copper dome used as a social studies classroom. The administration building houses administration, social studies, English, and foreign language classes.

Auditorium
The campus features a 1,211 seat auditorium that resembles the RKO Theater, now known as Radio City Music Hall. The auditorium was renamed the Barb Gensler Theater for The Dramatic Arts in 2012 in honor of retired drama department director Barbara Gensler and her 47 years of service to the school.

Fitness Center
In 1998 the Manual Arts Building which housed woods, metals and drafting classes, was renovated and now houses the Community Fitness Center.

John F. Nickoll Stadium
John F. Nickoll Stadium in Shorewood is the home to the Shorewood High School football, boys and girls soccer, and, boys and girls lacrosse teams.  It also had two stints as a home venue for the Milwaukee Panthers football team of the University of Wisconsin–Milwaukee from 1956–67 and again in 1972.  The stadium has also occasionally served as a home for Milwaukee's club (non-NCAA sanctioned) football team since 2003.

Extra-curricular activities

Performing arts
The Shorewood Drama Department produces a minimum of three shows annually. It was the first high school in its area to perform the musical "A Chorus Line" in 1986, and the first in the nation to perform "Rent" (the high school edition) in 2006. In 2006, they also performed "Urinetown the Musical". The high school has been mentioned in The New York Times, along with three other schools, for its outstanding theater and its ability to "spend more money on a drama production than on their director's annual salary."
In May 2013, they performed "Spring Awakening", sparking both criticism and praise from community members. The show was performed unedited from the original Broadway production, and students were required to turn in a signed parent permission slip to audition for the musical.

Student newspaper
Founded in 1922, Shorewood Ripples is the student newspaper. The entire 1921-1922 SHS student body (seven students) contributed to the first edition, which was a yearbook with a literary bent.

In addition to covering stories at SHS, Ripples reports on stories in other Shorewood schools, and the greater community. A staff of over 30 students bring ten or more issues per year to press. Most issues have 12 to 20 pages. With a circulation of between 800 and 1000, the publication reaches students and residents throughout the village of Shorewood.

Ripples subscribes to the Code of Ethics of the Society of Professional Journalists, including the obligation to perform with intelligence, objectivity, accuracy and fairness.

Athletics

State tournament history
1924-25: Boys' tennis champion
1925-26: Boys' tennis champion + 
1926-27: Boys' tennis champion
1928-29: Boys' tennis champion
1931-32: Boys' swimming & diving runner-up
1932-33: Boys' swimming & diving
1933-34: Boys' swimming & diving
1934-35: Boys' swimming & diving champion
1935-36: Boys' swimming & diving
1936-37: Boys' swimming & diving champion
1936-37: Boys' basketball Class B quarterfinal
1937-38: Boys' basketball quarterfinal
1937-38: Boys' swimming & diving
1938-39: Boys' swimming & diving champion
1938-39: Boys' basketball quarterfinal
1939-40: Boys' basketball quarterfinal
1939-40: Boys' swimming & diving
1940-41: Boys' swimming & diving
1940-41: Boys' basketball quarterfinal
1941-42: Boys' basketball champion
1941-42: Boys' swimming & diving
1942-43: Boys' swimming & diving
1948-49: Boys' swimming & diving
1954-55: Boys' basketball 1st round
1960-61: Boys' track & field Class B
1965-66: Boys' track & field Class B runner-up
1974-75: Girls' volleyball Class B
1975-76: Girls’ volleyball Class B
1980-81: Boys’ basketball Class B semi-finalist
1981-82: Girls’ tennis runner-up
1990-91: Girls’ volleyball Division 2 semi-finalist
1994-95: Girls’ Gymnastics Division 1*
1995-96: Girls’ Gymnastics Division 1*
1994-95: Girls’ swimming & diving Division 2
1995-96: Girls’ swimming & diving Division 2
1996-97: Girls’ swimming & diving Division 2
1996-97: Girls’ Gymnastics Division 1 runner-up*
1997-98: Girls’ swimming & diving Division 2
1997-98: Boys’ soccer Division 2 champion
2000-01: Boys’ cross country Division 2 champion
2000-01: Boys’ tennis Division 2 runner-up
2000-01: Boys’ volleyball quarterfinal
2001-02: Girls’ swimming & diving Division 2 champion
2001-02: Boys’ volleyball Semi-Final
2002-03: Girls’ swimming & diving Division 2
2003-04: Girls’ swimming & diving Division 2
2003-04: Boys’ cross country Division 2 State Champions
2004-05: Boys’ cross country Division 2 State Champions
2004-05: Boys’ soccer Division 2 runner-up
2005-06: Boys’ cross country Division 2 State Champions
2005-06: Boys’ volleyball semi-final 
2006-07: Boys’ cross country Division 2 State Champions
2006-07: Boys’ tennis Division 2 Doubles
2007-08: Boys’ cross country Division 2 runner up
2009-10: Boys’ cross country Division 2 State Champions 
2010-11: Boys’ cross country Division 2 State Champions

2012-13: Girls' swimming & diving Division 2

2015-16: Girls Cross Country Division 2 Runner Up

2019-20: Girls Cross Country Division 2 State Champions

2019-20: Boys Soccer Division 3 State Champions

2020-21: Girls Track & Field Division 2 Runner Up

2021-22: Boys Cross Country Division 2 State Champions

2021-22: Girls Cross Country Division 2 Runner Up

2021-22: Boys Soccer Division 3 State Champions

 - Co-Op team with Whitefish Bay High School
+ - Tie With Milwaukee Washington (See Reference)

Cross country
Shorewood's boys' cross country team won four straight WIAA Division 2 State Championships (2003–06), making them the first Division 2 school ever to do so. It also won the state meet in 2000, 2009, and 2010. It was state runner-up in 2007. Shorewood took home yet another state title in 2012, being the first division 2 team to have five finishers under seventeen minutes for the 5k race. In 2021 the boys team won another Division 2 State Championship, led by the Division 2 Individual Champion Nathan Cumberbatch.

The girls' program made three appearances at the WIAA state meet with an individual victory and a state course record in 2006. The girls' team won their first Division 2 State Championship in 2019, and finished as runners up in 2015 and 2021. The girls finished 12th in the Nike Heartland XC Regional Championships in 2021.

Notable alumni
Jim Abrahams, filmmaker
Les Aspin, Congressman and United States Secretary of Defense
Kate Baldwin, Broadway actress, nominated for Best Actress in a Musical for her performance in Finian's Rainbow
Dickey Chapelle (born Georgette Louise Meyer), photojournalist.
John Fiedler, actor, voice of Piglet
Lewis Friedman, screenwriter 
Paul C. Gartzke, Presiding Judge of the Wisconsin Court of Appeals
Jerry Harrison (Jeremiah Griffin Harrison), member of Talking Heads
Walter Heller, economist and Chairman of the Council of Economic Advisers during the Kennedy and Johnson administrations
Kirby Hendee, Wisconsin State Senator 
Bonnie Ladwig, Wisconsin politician
Stephen R. Leopold, Wisconsin State Representative
Marcus Monroe, actor, juggler, and TV personality
Lloyd Pettit, Emmy-award-winning sports broadcaster.
Charlotte Rae, actress (Mrs. Garrett on The Facts of Life)
William Rehnquist, Chief Justice of the United States Supreme Court
John Rinka, college basketball player at Kenyon College who is among the NCAA top ten all-time scorers (3,251 points)
Ben L. Salomon, Medal of Honor recipient
John Searle, analytic philosopher
Ben Seidman, sleight-of-hand performer, actor, comedian, and creative consultant
Robert J. Shaw, screenwriter
Leif Shiras, professional tennis player
Andrew Tallon (1969 – 2018), art historian
Thomas Vonier, architect, president of International Union of Architects
Joan Walsh, national affairs correspondent, The Nation magazine
 Doris Gnauck White, science educator
David Zucker, movie director.
Jerry Zucker, movie director
Martin Vogt (Haywyre) Musician, music producer, composer, and DJ.

References

External links
 Shorewood High School
 Shorewood School District

Educational institutions established in 1925
Public high schools in Wisconsin
Schools in Milwaukee County, Wisconsin
1925 establishments in Wisconsin